Parasi  is a place in Ramgram, Nepal Municipality in Parasi District in the Lumbini Province of southern Nepal. At the time of the 1991 Nepal census, it had a population of 7281 people living in 1320 individual households. It is in Terai region. Parasi touch India in south. Ramgram stupa and Palhi temple are famous religious place in Parasi.

References

Populated places in Parasi District